Salvia hypargeia is a herbaceous perennial native to Turkey.

Leaves are simple to simple basal, linear to linear-oblong, greenish on top and whitish on the underside. Flowers are arranged in verticelles, with 4–8 flowers per verticelle.

Notes

hypargeia
Flora of Turkey